Santhipuram mandal is one of the 66 mandals in Chittoor district of the Indian state of Andhra Pradesh. The headquarters are located at Arimuthanapalle . The mandal is bounded by Ramakuppam, Kuppam and Gudupalle mandals..This mandal is under Kuppam Revenue Division.

Demographics 

 census, the mandal had a population of 61,789. The total population constitute, 31,431 males and 30,358 females —a sex ratio of 966 females per 1000 males. 7,539 children are in the age group of 0–6 years, of which 3,938 are boys and 3,601 are girls. The average literacy rate stands at 62.85% with 34,096 literates.

Towns and villages 

 census, the mandal has 13 settlements. It includes 1 town and 12 villages. Santhipuram (M) is the most populated, and well improved village and Nelapadu is the least populated village in the mandal.
Transportation have state government services are available from Kuppam to Vijayawada, Tirupati, Hyderabad. For Tamil Nadu, services are available for Krishnagiri, Erode, Salem, Coimbatore, and for Karnataka services available to Kolar, KGF (Kolar gold fields).
The settlements in the mandal are listed below:

See also 
 List of mandals in Andhra Pradesh

References

Mandals in Chittoor district